Poa curtifolia is a species of grass found on serpentine soils in the Wenatchee Mountains of Washington State.

Description
Poa curtifolia is a small grass with firm prominently veined blue-green leaves that are 1.5-3.0 mm wide, generally with a thickened whitish margin. The leaf collar is yellowish and the ligule is membranous.

Range and ecology
Poa curtifolia is endemic to serpentine scree and soils in the Wenatchee Mountains of Washington State.

Taxonomy

References

curtifolia